Janadesh is the name of a national campaign on land rights in India launched by the movement Ekta Parishad. The word "Janadesh" means "The Verdict of the People" in Hindi. The campaign was launched in 2005 and culminated in 2007, in the form of a 350 km foot march involving 25,000 people. According to the organizers, the majority of the marchers were landless Adivasi and Dalit.

According to Ekta Parishad the lack of secure land rights is a major contributor to rural poverty in India, and the government of India needs to undertake major land reforms to address this issue. The aim of the Janadesh campaign is to put pressure on the Indian government to undertake specific land reforms aimed at securing land rights for the poorest groups in India.

Rural poverty in India
According to a recent World Bank report poverty remains a significant problem in India, with India's progress in reducing poverty compared with some of its Asian neighbors described as 'modest'. According to the same report, poverty in India is most widespread in rural areas (where almost three out of four Indians live), and the highest incidence of poverty of all is found among the rural landless, 68% of whom are classed as living below the poverty line.
These findings are echoed in other reports on the subject. For example, Sundaram and Tendulkar found in a 2003 study of poverty in India that the highest levels of poverty were found among assetless (i.e. landless) rural households dependent on agricultural wage labor. Levels of poverty were found to be even higher among members of this group if they also belonged to either a Scheduled Tribe or Scheduled Caste.
Furthermore, although at an overall percentage level rural poverty is decreasing in India, due to population growth the absolute number of people in rural areas below the poverty line is not decreasing.

Obviously there are differing viewpoints on what measures would be most effective to alleviate poverty among these groups. According to Ekta Parishad, the single most important measure that could be taken to reduce these levels of poverty would be to grant secure land rights to small pieces of land to landless peasants, reducing their dependence on casual wage labor and providing a measure of food security.

These views are supported by research in the area. For example, Hanstad, Brown, and Prosterman suggest based on research in Karnataka and West Bengal that providing amply-sized plots of land (these can be as small as 0.05-0.15 acres in size) gives substantial benefits to landless families at relatively low costs. These benefits include increased income, increased access to credit, and increased social status. They also note that based on the land costs in their Karnataka study, the cost of a program to distribute packages of land like this to the ten million poorest families in India would be approximately 3,330 million rupees spread over ten years. By contrast, the central government's rural housing scheme has cost 15,360 million rupees per year over the past five years, whilst producing housing viewed as being of very low quality by the participants in this study. Hanstad, Brown and Prosterman also cite numerous other studies from around the world which have shown results similar to their own.

Current state of land reform in India
In Ekta Parishad's experience of campaigning across eight states in India they found that even having a land entitlement did not necessarily equate to possessing land. In fact they found that in around 50% of cases having a land entitlement had not led to possession of the land itself.

There are a number factors involved in creating this situation.

Firstly, land records, which provide the basis for land ownership, are out of date in India. The Indian government is currently working to computerize land records to improve efficiency. However, a recent report by the Asian Development Bank pointed out that, more than computerizing records, correcting them should be the priority. They note that: "It is a common observation in villages that the person in whose name land is recorded is either deceased or does not possess the land".

Secondly, according to a recent discussion paper produced by PACS, even if land records are up to date, they do not ensure security of possession. If the poor are dispossessed of their land the record of their possession itself is of little use – instead they have to go to court to establish their title. The process for establishing title is such that a wealthy opponent is able to prolong the process for years through higher courts of appeal, which the poor can ill afford. Thus the land record system is fundamentally anti-poor, and provides little protection against land grabs by wealthier land-owners. These land grabs take a variety of forms, from simple violent expulsion through to bribery of government or bank officials. It is often more than a simple question of the economic value of the land. R Srivastava argues that the landed are often not in favor of giving land to the landless since it increases their autonomy and ability to demand better wages. He also notes the wealthy landed often have substantial influence over politician and administrators at the state level.

Finally, the national government has reserved for itself substantial powers of land acquisition through the 'Land Acquisition Act' of 1984. This permits the central government to acquire any area of land that it chooses if it is in the 'public interest' to do so. However, the term 'public interest' is left undefined in this legislation, giving the government exceptionally broad powers to acquire land as and when it chooses.

Taken all together, these factors combine to create a system of land ownership which provides little security for the rural poor.

Objectives of Janadesh 2007
Based on this view of current land legislation Ekta Parishad argue that it is only through legislative action at a national level that lasting change can be achieved. Although campaigns at state level have resulted in a number of successes in terms of distributing land to the landless, there need to be major changes at the national level to create a system of land rights that protects the rights of the poor and ensures that they can actually benefit from their land.

The Janadesh campaign is seen as a means of connecting the numerous local campaigns which they are involved in into a single national campaign large enough to pressure the government into taking action.

The Janadesh 2007 campaign will culminate with a foot march by 25,000 people, mainly landless Adivasis and Dalits. The route of the march will be from Gwalior to Delhi in northern India, following the main highway (a distance of approximately 350 km). The march will set out from Gwalior on 2 October 2007 and will arrive in Delhi on 28 October 2007. This will be an act of mass non-violent civil disobedience in the tradition of Gandhi. According to Ekta Parishad, it will be the largest such action since the struggle for Indian independence.

The campaign has three specific demands around land reform. These are:

 Establishment of a National Land Authority to provide a clear statement of land utilization in India, identify the lands available for redistribution and strengthen pro-poor laws
 Establishment of fast track courts to settle past and future conflicts related to land
 Establishment of a single window system so that farmers can resolve easily and freely the land issues, without wasting time, money and energy

Ekta Parishad
The Janadesh 2007 campaign is being organized by Ekta Parishad, an organization that was formally established in 1990. According to its founder, Puthan Veetil Rajagopal, Ekta Parishad is not an NGO or a political party. It is instead a people's movement, which works at the grass-roots level to mobilize people to challenge corruption and exploitation.
Quoted in the book "Truth Force" Rajagopal states this aim: "What I am trying to do, through Ekta Parishad, is to help people to understand that they can be leaders of the country". Ekta Parishad are particularly focused on land and livelihood issues amongst marginalized communities (such as Dalits and Adivasis) in rural India and are active in eight Indian states (Madhya Pradesh, Chhattisgarh, Orissa, Bihar, Jharkhand, Uttar Pradesh, Tamil Nadu and Kerala), and in direct contact with around 4000 villages.

There are two main components to Ekta Parishad's work – the struggle component and constructive work.

The struggle component involves mobilizing people to take part in various forms of non-violent resistance such as Padyatras (foot marches), Dharnas (sit-ins), Gheraos (preventing unjust incidents from taking place by encircling people who wield power), and Chakka jam (road blockades) to press for their land rights. This is based on the Gandhian tradition of non-violent resistance.

The constructive work focuses on running economic and development activities alongside the land rights struggle, with the intention of allowing villages that have gained land to become economically self-sufficient. These activities include:
 Providing spaces for the sale of village produce (e.g. handicrafts, khadi, honey, rice, oil) in urban centers;
 Promoting agricultural development through organic farming methods and cultivation of herbal plants for medicinal purposes;
 Development of irrigation schemes, and small-scale economic programs like running shops, grain banks, fishery, poultry and goat rearing.

Gallery

References
World Bank, India: Achievements and Challenges in Reducing Poverty, World Bank Country Study, 1997
K Sundaram, Suresh Tendulkar, Poverty among Social and Economic Groups in India in 1990s, Economic and Political Weekly, 13 December 2003
T Hanstad, J Brown, R Prosterman, Larger Homestead Plots as Land Reform?, Economic and Political Weekly, 20 July 2002
Towards a Peoples Land Policy, PACS Discussion Paper, 2007
R S Deshpande, Emerging Issues in Land Policy, Asian Development Bank Policy Brief, 2007
R S Srivatava, Land Reforms, Employment and Poverty in India, 2006
H Drakakis, Truth Force: The Land Rights Movement in India, 2003

External links
 The Janadesh website (English)
 The Janadesh website (French)
 The Ekta Parishad website
 Articles by ‘Peuples Solidaires’ on Janadesh
 ‘Land for Life’ march in support of Janadesh
 The involvement of the ‘Confédération paysanne’ for Janadesh
 Trilingual Belgian march in support of Janadesh from 19 to 21 oct.
 The newsletter of Solifonds (June 2007) dedicated to Janadesh
 ‘Solidarité’, French NGO present Janadesh
 ‘Action Village India’, a UK partner of Ekta Parishad
 Detailed article about Rajagopal and related video interview of José Bové.

Agriculture in India
Nonviolence
Rural development in India